Blood of Heroes may refer to:

 The Blood of Heroes, a 1989 post-apocalyptic film directed by David Webb Peoples
 Blood of Heroes (EP), a 2002 EP by Polish black metal band Graveland
 The Blood of Heroes (band), a Brooklyn New York alternative rock group
 Blood of Heroes (role-playing game), a superhero role-playing game by Pulsar Games